Sebrus argus is a moth in the family Crambidae. It was described by Graziano Bassi in 1995. It is found in the Democratic Republic of the Congo.

References

Crambinae
Moths described in 1995
Endemic fauna of the Democratic Republic of the Congo